Napasar is a town located in the Bikaner district in the Indian state of Rajasthan. 
It is also known as one of most holy place of Bikaner.

Napasar was established as a "co-city" by the contemporary King of the Bikaner state: Maharaja Bikaji and Napaji Sankhala. The city nearest to Napasar is Bikaner, which is only 29 kilometers away. The Napasar railway station is located near the town and connects to the  Bikaner-Rewari main line of NWR. The highway NH 11 is 12 kilometres outside of the town. Napasar is older than Bikaner.

The native language is Marwari.

Napasar is one of the largest Gram Panchayat of India. Napasar is also well known for being the birthplace of freedom fighter, social worker and their ex sarpanch Late Bajrang Lal Asopa, also known as Netaji. He worked for welfare of the village and his so-called "Fakira Fauz". After he died, a statue of him was placed in the main market and in the Gram Panchayat.

Napasar has industries in manufacturing woolen shawls, cotton chaddars (robes), textiles, tiles, PVC, timber, food processing bhujia and papad, among other things. Their textile and cotton industries are growing fast. Many people in Napasar have jobs in agriculture or investment. Because of the large number of jobs in agriculture, the city is able to produce food for the local market.

References 

Villages in Bikaner district